Amanda Harper Mercier (born 1975) is a Judge of the Georgia Court of Appeals.

Early life and education

Mercier was born in 1975 in Cleveland, Tennessee. She received her Bachelor of Arts from the University of Georgia and her Juris Doctor from Syracuse University College of Law.

Legal career

After graduating law school she began her career in private practice with the Law Office of David E. Ralston. Mercier practiced both criminal and civil litigation from 2001 until her appointment as a Superior Court Judge in 2010. She is a member of the Federalist Society.

State court service

She was appointed to the Appalachian Circuit bench on April 16, 2010 by Governor Sonny Perdue.

Appointment to Georgia Court of Appeals

On October 29, 2015 Governor Nathan Deal announced her appointment to the Georgia Court of Appeals. She was sworn into office on January 4, 2016.

Personal life

Mercier has been married to her husband Joe Foster since 2001, and together they have one child, Alexandria. They reside in Blue Ridge, Georgia.

References

External links
Official Biography on Georgia Judicial Branch website

1975 births
Living people
20th-century American lawyers
20th-century American women lawyers
21st-century American judges
21st-century American women judges
Federalist Society members
Georgia Court of Appeals judges
Georgia (U.S. state) state court judges
Georgia (U.S. state) lawyers
People from Cleveland, Tennessee
Syracuse University College of Law alumni
University of Georgia alumni